The Jewish Constituency (No.220) is a Russian legislative constituency in the Jewish Autonomous Oblast. It is the only legislative constituency in the Jewish AO.

Members elected

Election results

1993

|-
! colspan=2 style="background-color:#E9E9E9;text-align:left;vertical-align:top;" |Candidate
! style="background-color:#E9E9E9;text-align:left;vertical-align:top;" |Party
! style="background-color:#E9E9E9;text-align:right;" |Votes
! style="background-color:#E9E9E9;text-align:right;" |%
|-
|style="background-color: " |
|align=left|Anatoly Biryukov
|align=left|Independent
|18,695
|26.55%
|-
|style="background-color: " |
|align=left|Vladimir Ulanov
|align=left|Independent
| -
|21.80%
|-
| colspan="5" style="background-color:#E9E9E9;"|
|- style="font-weight:bold"
| colspan="3" style="text-align:left;" | Total
| 70,426
| 100%
|-
| colspan="5" style="background-color:#E9E9E9;"|
|- style="font-weight:bold"
| colspan="4" |Source:
|
|}

1995

|-
! colspan=2 style="background-color:#E9E9E9;text-align:left;vertical-align:top;" |Candidate
! style="background-color:#E9E9E9;text-align:left;vertical-align:top;" |Party
! style="background-color:#E9E9E9;text-align:right;" |Votes
! style="background-color:#E9E9E9;text-align:right;" |%
|-
|style="background-color: " |
|align=left|Sergey Shtogrin
|align=left|Communist Party
|20,216
|22.71%
|-
|style="background-color: " |
|align=left|Maria Zhirdetskaya
|align=left|Independent
|17,979
|20.19%
|-
|style="background-color: " |
|align=left|Alla Gerber
|align=left|Independent
|12,398
|13.92%
|-
|style="background-color: #FE4801" |
|align=left|Georgy Gulyaev
|align=left|Pamfilova–Gurov–Lysenko
|6,677
|7.50%
|-
|style="background-color: " |
|align=left|Anatoly Biryukov (incumbent)
|align=left|Agrarian Party
|6,409
|7.20%
|-
|style="background-color: " |
|align=left|Anatoly Beskhmel'nitsyn
|align=left|Independent
|6,038
|6.78%
|-
|style="background-color: #2C299A" |
|align=left|Miron Fishbeyn
|align=left|Congress of Russian Communities
|1,833
|2.06%
|-
|style="background-color: #DD137B" |
|align=left|Anatoly Gorelik
|align=left|Social Democrats
|1,148
|1.29%
|-
|style="background-color:#000000"|
|colspan=2 |against all
|15,147
|17.01%
|-
| colspan="5" style="background-color:#E9E9E9;"|
|- style="font-weight:bold"
| colspan="3" style="text-align:left;" | Total
| 89,035
| 100%
|-
| colspan="5" style="background-color:#E9E9E9;"|
|- style="font-weight:bold"
| colspan="4" |Source:
|
|}

1999

|-
! colspan=2 style="background-color:#E9E9E9;text-align:left;vertical-align:top;" |Candidate
! style="background-color:#E9E9E9;text-align:left;vertical-align:top;" |Party
! style="background-color:#E9E9E9;text-align:right;" |Votes
! style="background-color:#E9E9E9;text-align:right;" |%
|-
|style="background-color: "|
|align=left|Sergey Shtogrin (incumbent)
|align=left|Independent
|38,739
|48.46%
|-
|style="background-color: #23238E"|
|align=left|Anatoly Tikhomirov
|align=left|Our Home – Russia
|11,456
|14.33%
|-
|style="background-color: " |
|align=left|Konstantin Ashurov
|align=left|Independent
|10,204
|12.77%
|-
|style="background-color: " |
|align=left|Valentina Bychkova
|align=left|Independent
|6,204
|7.76%
|-
|style="background-color:#000000"|
|colspan=2 |against all
|11,901
|14.89%
|-
| colspan="5" style="background-color:#E9E9E9;"|
|- style="font-weight:bold"
| colspan="3" style="text-align:left;" | Total
| 79,932
| 100%
|-
| colspan="5" style="background-color:#E9E9E9;"|
|- style="font-weight:bold"
| colspan="4" |Source:
|
|}

2003

|-
! colspan=2 style="background-color:#E9E9E9;text-align:left;vertical-align:top;" |Candidate
! style="background-color:#E9E9E9;text-align:left;vertical-align:top;" |Party
! style="background-color:#E9E9E9;text-align:right;" |Votes
! style="background-color:#E9E9E9;text-align:right;" |%
|-
|style="background-color: "|
|align=left|Sergey Shtogrin (incumbent)
|align=left|Communist Party
|37,203
|48.11%
|-
|style="background-color: " |
|align=left|Andrey Vinogradov
|align=left|United Russia
|19,241
|24.88%
|-
|style="background-color: " |
|align=left|Artur Amelin
|align=left|Liberal Democratic Party
|4,298
|5.56%
|-
|style="background-color: " |
|align=left|Aleksey Khomchenko
|align=left|Yabloko
|3,722
|4.81%
|-
|style="background-color: " |
|align=left|Anatoly Maksimov
|align=left|Independent
|2,646
|3.42%
|-
|style="background-color: " |
|align=left|Yevgeny Shimanovich
|align=left|Independent
|1,229
|1.59%
|-
|style="background-color:#000000"|
|colspan=2 |against all
|7,778
|10.06%
|-
| colspan="5" style="background-color:#E9E9E9;"|
|- style="font-weight:bold"
| colspan="3" style="text-align:left;" | Total
| 77,393
| 100%
|-
| colspan="5" style="background-color:#E9E9E9;"|
|- style="font-weight:bold"
| colspan="4" |Source:
|
|}

2016

|-
! colspan=2 style="background-color:#E9E9E9;text-align:left;vertical-align:top;" |Candidate
! style="background-color:#E9E9E9;text-align:left;vertical-align:top;" |Party
! style="background-color:#E9E9E9;text-align:right;" |Votes
! style="background-color:#E9E9E9;text-align:right;" |%
|-
|style="background-color: " |
|align=left|Anatoly Tikhomirov
|align=left|United Russia
|21,783
|41.50%
|-
|style="background-color: " |
|align=left|Konstantin Lazarev
|align=left|Communist Party
|10,384
|19.79%
|-
|style="background-color: " |
|align=left|Galina Timchenko
|align=left|Liberal Democratic Party
|8,041
|15.32%
|-
|style="background-color: " |
|align=left|Ivan Prokhodtsev
|align=left|Independent
|3,688
|7.03%
|-
|style="background-color: " |
|align=left|Vladimir Dudin
|align=left|A Just Russia
|2,699
|5.14%
|-
|style="background: #E62020;"| 
|align=left|Konstantin Larionov
|align=left|Communists of Russia
|1,952
|3.72%
|-
|style="background: ;"| 
|align=left|Vasily Dmitrienko
|align=left|Yabloko
|988
|1.88%
|-
| colspan="5" style="background-color:#E9E9E9;"|
|- style="font-weight:bold"
| colspan="3" style="text-align:left;" | Total
| 52,483
| 100%
|-
| colspan="5" style="background-color:#E9E9E9;"|
|- style="font-weight:bold"
| colspan="4" |Source:
|
|}

2021

|-
! colspan=2 style="background-color:#E9E9E9;text-align:left;vertical-align:top;" |Candidate
! style="background-color:#E9E9E9;text-align:left;vertical-align:top;" |Party
! style="background-color:#E9E9E9;text-align:right;" |Votes
! style="background-color:#E9E9E9;text-align:right;" |%
|-
|style="background-color: " |
|align=left|Alexander Petrov
|align=left|United Russia
|41,421
|53.19%
|-
|style="background-color: " |
|align=left|Konstantin Lazarev
|align=left|Communist Party
|14,256
|18.31%
|-
|style="background-color: " |
|align=left|Vasily Gladkikh
|align=left|Liberal Democratic Party
|5,727
|7.35%
|-
|style="background-color: " |
|align=left|Vladimir Dudin
|align=left|A Just Russia — For Truth
|4,052
|5.20%
|-
|style="background-color: " |
|align=left|Tatyana Fayn
|align=left|Party of Pensioners
|3,310
|4.25%
|-
|style="background-color: " |
|align=left|Marina Smirnova
|align=left|Communists of Russia
|3,127
|4.02%
|-
|style="background-color: "|
|align=left|Grigory Zinich
|align=left|Rodina
|2,069
|2.66%
|-
| colspan="5" style="background-color:#E9E9E9;"|
|- style="font-weight:bold"
| colspan="3" style="text-align:left;" | Total
| 77,872
| 100%
|-
| colspan="5" style="background-color:#E9E9E9;"|
|- style="font-weight:bold"
| colspan="4" |Source:
|
|}

Notes

Sources
220. Еврейский одномандатный избирательный округ

References

Russian legislative constituencies
Politics of the Jewish Autonomous Oblast